AMC-23 (formerly GE-23) is an American geostationary communications satellite that was launched by an Proton-M / Briz-M launch vehicle at 02:28:40 UTC on 29 December 2005. The  satellite to provide services to the Asia-Pacific, West Coast of the United States through separate beams to each region, after parking over the Pacific Ocean through its 18 (+4) C-band and 20 (+6) Ku-band transponders, over 186° West longitude.

GE-2i/AMC-13/Worldsat-3/AMC-23 
AMC-13 was originally ordered as GE-2i. In early 2004, AMC-13 was transferred to Worldsat LLC, a new subsidiary of SES Americom as Worldsat 3. The original AMC-13 was to features 60 C-Band transponders, but when transferred to Worldsat, it was ordered to be changed to the hybrid C-/Ku-band payload with 18 C-band and 20 Ku-band transponders. In early 2005, it was renamed AMC-23.

GE-23 
In 2007, the satellite was spun-off from SES Americom to GE-Satellite, when General Electric split off from SES. After this transaction, the satellite was renamed GE-23.

Eutelsat-172A 
Eutelsat has announced in June 2012 the acquisition of GE-23 satellite from GE-Satellite. The satellite is renamed to Eutelsat 172A and expands Eutelsat coverage to Asia-Pacific region and West Coast of United States of America. The satellite had at that time an estimated lifespan of 8.5 years.

Eutelsat-174A 
In 2017, after Eutelsat 172B had replaced it, Eutelsat 172A was moved to 174° East and renamed Eutelsat 174A.

See also

References 

Communications satellites in geosynchronous orbit
SES satellites
Spacecraft launched in 2005